Oenopota undata is a species of sea snail, a marine gastropod mollusk in the family Mangeliidae.

This is a nomen dubium.

Description
The length of the shell attains 16 mm.

Distribution
This marine species was found in the Annapolis Basin, Bay of Fundy, Nova Scotia, Canada.

References

 Verkruzen, T. A. 1878. Zur Fauna von Neu-Schotland (Nova Scotia) und Neufundland Jahrbücher der Deutschen Malakozoologischen Gesellschaft 5 208–230.

External links
  Tucker, J.K. 2004 Catalog of recent and fossil turrids (Mollusca: Gastropoda). Zootaxa 682:1-1295.

undata
Gastropods described in 1878